Pompeo Cornazzano, O. Cist. (1576–1647) was a Roman Catholic prelate who served as Bishop of Parma (1615–1647).

Biography
Pompeo Cornazzano was born in Pavie, Italy in 1576 and ordained a priest in the Order of Cistercians.
On 2 Dec 1615, he was appointed during the papacy of Pope Paul V as Bishop of Parma.
On 8 Dec 1615, he was consecrated bishop by Fabrizio Verallo, Cardinal-Priest of Sant'Agostino, with Giovanni Linati, Bishop of Borgo San Donnino, and Antonio Massa, Bishop of Castro del Lazio, serving as co-consecrators. 
He served as Bishop of Parma until his death on 5 Jul 1647.

While bishop, he was the principal co-consecrator of Hyacinthus Arnolfini, Bishop of Milos (1625); and Girolamo Binago, Titular Bishop of Laodicea in Phrygia and Auxiliary Bishop of Bologna (1637).

References

External links and additional sources
 (for Chronology of Bishops) 
 (for Chronology of Bishops) 

17th-century Italian Roman Catholic bishops
Bishops appointed by Pope Paul V
1576 births
1647 deaths
Cistercian bishops